The 2006–07 season was the 110th season of competitive football in Scotland.

Notable events

2006
9 July: Rangers defender Fernando Ricksen is banned for the club's pre-season trip to South Africa, following an incident on the outbound flight. Manager Paul Le Guen cited "wholly inappropriate and unacceptable" behaviour as the reason for Ricksen's omission. Ricksen later admitted that he fears for his future at Rangers claiming that the club have other motives for wanting him out. He was later loaned to Russian Premier League club Zenit Saint Petersburg.
29 July: Scotland under-19s lose 2–1 to Spain in the final of the European Under-19 Football Championship.
23 October: In the wake of their 2–0 home defeat to Kilmarnock, Hearts head coach Valdas Ivanauskas is given a two-week leave of absence after discussions with majority shareholder Vladimir Romanov. Ivanauskas cited ill-health as the reason for his temporary departure. Sporting Director, and former coach of Belarus, Eduard Malofeev is appointed for the interim.
27 October: Hearts' majority shareholder Vladimir Romanov states that he will sell players if the club fail to beat Dunfermline Athletic in their forthcoming fixture. Club captain Steven Pressley released a statement shortly after expressing the players' discontent at the current situation at the club.
14 November: After their 1–1 draw away at Falkirk, Hearts announce that interim head coach Eduard Malofeev is to be replaced by FBK Kaunas manager Eugenijus Riabovas, this is to allow Malofeev to pursue his Uefa coaching Pro-licence.
24 November: Valdas Ivanauskas returns as Hearts head-coach.
9 December: Hearts part company with captain Steven Pressley.
20 December: Dundee part company with striker Andy McLaren after he was given three red cards in a 2–1 defeat to Clyde.

2007
1 January: It is reported that Barry Ferguson has been stripped of the captaincy of Rangers and will not play for the club again under Paul Le Guen. Gavin Rae is appointed as the new captain.
2 January: Paul Le Guen confirms that Gavin Rae will be the new Rangers captain. With regard to Barry Ferguson he stated "When you have someone you feel undermines you, it becomes harder and harder". Asked whether Ferguson had been placed on the transfer list, Le Guen said "It remains to be seen. My own position, which is precarious, may have an influence on that."
4 January: Paul Le Guen leaves Rangers by mutual consent after meeting with Rangers chairman Sir David Murray.
8 January: The Scottish Football Association reject an approach from Rangers for manager Walter Smith. A statement from the SFA revealed that Smith had requested to be relieved of his contract, however this was refused following a meeting.
10 January: Walter Smith is confirmed as Rangers manager, having resigned from his position as Scotland manager. The SFA release a statement stating that "No agreement has been reached with Mr Smith or Rangers Football Club on any compensation payment" and "In the absence of agreement, proceedings will require to be raised against Mr Smith for breach of contract and Rangers Football Club for inducement to breach the contract."
11 January: The SFA agree a compensation package with Rangers over manager Walter Smith's switch to Ibrox.
2 March: For the second time of the season, Hearts manager Valdas Ivanauskas is given leave of absence by the club. Sporting Director, and former CSKA Moscow player Anatoly Korobochka is appointed on a temporary basis.
18 March: Hibernian win the Scottish League Cup, defeating Kilmarnock 5–1 in the final.
7 April: Second Division team Forfar Athletic become the first team in Scotland to confirm their relegation following a 9–1 defeat by Greenock Morton.
14 April: Greenock Morton are promoted as champions of the Second Division, despite losing 2–0 to Raith Rovers.
21 April: Berwick Rangers are promoted as champions of the Third Division after a 1–0 win over Arbroath.
22 April: Celtic are crowned Scottish Premier League champions for the second successive season after defeating Kilmarnock 2–1.
28 April: Gretna win promotion to the Premier League as First Division champions after beating Ross County 3–2 at Victoria Park, a result that relegated County to the Second Division.
3 May: East Stirlingshire, having finished bottom of the Third Division for the fifth consecutive season, are told they will lose full member status if the club finish bottom again next season.
5 May: Rangers ensure second place in the SPL and entry to the UEFA Champions League Second qualifying round after defeating Celtic 2–0 at Ibrox.
12 May: Queen's Park gain promotion to the Second Division after defeating East Fife 7–2 on aggregate in the promotion play-off. The Glasgow club swap places with Stranraer who lost to East Fife in the semi-final stage.
12 May: Stirling Albion gain promotion to the First Division, and swap places with Airdrie United, after defeating the North Lanarkshire club 5–4 on aggregate in the promotion/relegation play-off match

12 May: Dunfermline Athletic are relegated to the First Division. A 2–1 defeat at Inverness, coupled with St Mirren's 3–2 win at Motherwell, meant the Fife club exit the SPL after seven seasons in the top flight.
16 May: Sevilla win the UEFA Cup after defeating Espanyol 3–1 on penalties at Hampden Park. The match had finished 2–2 after 90 minutes.
20 May: Aberdeen seal a UEFA Cup place for next season after defeating Rangers 2–0 at Pittodrie in the final game of the season.
26 May: SPL champions Celtic complete the double after defeating Dunfermline Athletic 1–0 to win the Scottish Cup for the 34th time.

Major transfer deals

2006

Celtic made preparations for the Champions League with the high-profile signings of Jan Vennegoor of Hesselink from PSV Eindhoven, Jiri Jarosik from Chelsea and Thomas Gravesen from Real Madrid while Stilyan Petrov left to join former boss Martin O'Neill at Aston Villa. Celtic also signed former Rangers striker Kenny Miller on a free transfer from Wolverhampton Wanderers. Rangers, under new manager Paul Le Guen, brought in several players including Jérémy Clément from Paris Saint Germain and Filip Sebo from Austria Vienna while Peter Løvenkrands departed for Schalke 04. Hearts paid £200,000 for PAOK Salonika defender Hristos Karipidis and sold Rudi Skácel to Southampton after a dispute between the player and the club. Hibs brought in English League Two defenders Rob Jones and Shelton Martis but lost last season's top scorer Derek Riordan who joined Celtic.

Domestic
20 June 2006 – Noel Hunt from Dunfermline Athletic to Dundee United, £50,000
23 June 2006 – Derek Riordan from Hibernian to Celtic, Undisclosed (reportedly £150,000)
1 July 2006 – Gary Caldwell from Hibernian to Celtic, Bosman
11 July 2006 – Ross McCormack from Rangers to Motherwell, Undisclosed
13 July 2006 – John Rankin from Ross County to Inverness CT, Undisclosed (reportedly £65,000)
11 August 2006 – David Proctor from Inverness CT to Dundee United, £35,000
19 August 2006 – David Fernández from Dundee United to Kilmarnock, Free
29 August 2006 – Jim Hamilton from Motherwell to Dunfermline Athletic, Undisclosed
31 August 2006 – Stephen Crawford from Aberdeen to Dunfermline Athletic, Free
31 August 2006 – John Stewart from Aberdeen to Falkirk, £50,000
31 August 2006 – Lee Miller from Dundee United to Aberdeen, Free

In
16 May 2006 – Libor Sionko from Austria Vienna to Rangers, Bosman
26 May 2006 – Karl Svensson from IFK Göteborg to Rangers, Undisclosed (reportedly £600,000)
8 June 2006 – Rob Jones from Grimsby Town to Hibernian, £100,000
16 June 2006 – Lionel Letizi from Paris Saint-Germain to Rangers, Free
19 June 2006 – Jiri Jarosik from Chelsea to Celtic, Undisclosed (reportedly £2m)
1 July 2006 – Kenny Miller from Wolverhampton Wanderers to Celtic, Bosman
7 July 2006 – Jérémy Clément from Olympique Lyonnais to Rangers, £1.1m
15 July 2006 – Makhtar N'Diaye from Unattached to Rangers, Free
28 July 2006 – Mauricio Pinilla from Sporting Lisbon to Heart of Midlothian, Season loan
1 August 2006 – Graham Barrett from Unattached to Falkirk, Free
1 August 2006 – Colin McMenamin from Shrewsbury Town to Gretna, Free
2 August 2006 – Christian Kalvenes from SK Brann to Dundee United, Free
2 August 2006 – Joe Hamill from Leicester City to Livingston, Free
3 August 2006 – Hristos Karipidis from PAOK Salonika to Heart of Midlothian, £200,000
3 August 2006 – Filip Sebo from Austria Wien to Rangers, £1.8m
4 August 2006 – Tiago Costa from Benfica to Heart of Midlothian, Free
11 August 2006 – Lee Martin from Manchester United to Rangers, Loan
11 August 2006 – Merouane Zemmama from Raja Casablanca to Hibernian, Free
14 August 2006 – Shelton Martis from Darlington to Hibernian, Free
15 August 2006 – Marius Zaliukas from FBK Kaunas to Heart of Midlothian, Loan
16 August 2006 – Phil Bardsley from Manchester United to Rangers, Loan
24 August 2006 – Lee Naylor from Wolverhampton Wanderers to Celtic, £600,000 (including Charles Mulgrew in exchange)
24 August 2006 – Jan Vennegoor of Hesselink from PSV Eindhoven to Celtic, £3.4m
29 August 2006 – Kęstutis Ivaškevičius from FBK Kaunas to Heart of Midlothian, Season loan
29 August 2006 – Andrius Velicka from FBK Kaunas to Heart of Midlothian, Season loan
29 August 2006 – Anthony Stokes from Arsenal to Falkirk, Loan
30 August 2006 – Thomas Gravesen from Real Madrid to Celtic, £2m
31 August 2006 – Saša Papac from Austria Wien to Rangers, £450,000
10 October 2006 – Lee Wilkie from Unattached to Dundee United, Free

Out
23 May 2006 – Peter Løvenkrands from Rangers to Schalke 04, Bosman
2 June 2006 – David McNamee from Livingston to Coventry City, £100,000
26 June 2006 – John Hartson from Celtic to West Bromwich Albion, Undisclosed
30 June 2006 – Steven Hammell from Motherwell to Southend United, Bosman
1 July 2006 – Kevin McNaughton from Aberdeen to Cardiff City, Bosman
29 July 2006 – Rudolf Skácel from Heart of Midlothian to Southampton, £1.6m
2 August 2006 – Jamie McAllister from Heart of Midlothian to Bristol City, Free
2 August 2006 – Chris Hackett from Heart of Midlothian to Millwall, Free
7 August 2006 – Adam Virgo from Celtic to Coventry City, Season loan
9 August 2006 – Lee Johnson from Heart of Midlothian to Bristol City, Free
11 August 2006 – Mohammed Camara from Celtic to Derby County, Free
14 August 2006 – Fernando Ricksen from Rangers to Zenit Saint Petersburg, Season loan
26 August 2006 – Hamed Namouchi from Rangers to FC Lorient, £500,000
30 August 2006 – Stilian Petrov from Celtic to Aston Villa, £6.5m
31 August 2006 – Stanislav Varga from Celtic to Sunderland, Undisclosed
31 August 2006 – Ross Wallace from Celtic to Sunderland, Undisclosed
28 November 2006 – Fernando Ricksen from Rangers to Zenit Saint Petersburg, £1m

2007
Celtic further strengthened their squad with the signings of Paul Hartley from Hearts and Mark Brown from Inverness, while Steven Pressley was also signed after being released by Hearts. Shaun Maloney joined Aston Villa after contract negotiations broke down. New Rangers manager Walter Smith brought in defenders David Weir, Andy Webster and Ugo Ehiogu and spent £2m on Hibs' highly rated midfielder Kevin Thomson. Hearts looked to boost their European qualification hopes with the signing of a further four players on loan from FBK Kaunas as well as Laryea Kingston from Terek Grozny. New Dunfermline boss Stephen Kenny brought in loan signings James O'Brien from Celtic, Adam Hammill from Liverpool and Stephen Glass from Hibs with the club bottom of the SPL.

Domestic
1 January 2007 – Morgaro Gomis from Cowdenbeath to Dundee United, Nominal fee
2 January 2007 – Ryan Stevenson from St Johnstone to Ayr United, Undisclosed
5 January 2007 – James O'Brien from Celtic to Dunfermline Athletic, Loan
6 January 2007 – Stephen Dobbie from St Johnstone to Queen of the South, Undisclosed
8 January 2007 – David Templeton from Stenhousemuir to Heart of Midlothian, £30,000
11 January 2007 – Markus Paatelainen from Cowdenbeath to Inverness Caledonian Thistle, Undisclosed
11 January 2007 – Paul McHale from Clyde to Dundee, Free
18 January 2007 – Mark Brown from Inverness Caledonian Thistle to Celtic, Undisclosed
19 January 2007 – Derek Carcary from Rangers to Raith Rovers, Free
25 January 2007 – Stephen Glass from Hibernian to Dunfermline Athletic, Loan
26 January 2007 – Stuart Golabek from Inverness Caledonian Thistle to Livingston, Loan
26 January 2007 – Derek Lilley from Morton to St Johnstone, Free
26 January 2007 – Jamie Mole from Heart of Midlothian to Livingston, Loan
26 January 2007 – Matthew Doherty from Heart of Midlothian to Cowdenbeath, Loan
26 January 2007 – Jamie MacDonald from Heart of Midlothian to Queen of the South, Loan
27 January 2007 – Willie Gibson from Queen of the South to Kilmarnock, Undisclosed
27 January 2007 – Willie Gibson from Kilmarnock to Queen of the South, Loan
27 January 2007 – Stevie Murray from Kilmarnock to Queen of the South, Loan
27 January 2007 – Jamie Adams from Kilmarnock to Queen of the South, Loan
30 January 2007 – Kevin Thomson from Hibernian to Rangers, £2m
31 January 2007 – Stephen O'Donnell from Clyde to St Mirren, Undisclosed
31 January 2007 – Eddie Malone from Clyde to St Mirren, Undisclosed
31 January 2007 – Kyle Macaulay from Aberdeen to Peterhead, Undisclosed
31 January 2007 – Paul Hartley from Heart of Midlothian to Celtic, Undisclosed
31 January 2007 – Alan Archibald from Dundee United to Partick Thistle, Free
31 January 2007 – Robert Snodgrass from Livingston to Stirling Albion, Loan
31 January 2007 – Steve Tosh from Gretna to Queen of the South, Free
6 March 2007 – Zbigniew Malkowski from Hibernian to Gretna, Loan

In
1 January 2007 – Steven Pressley from Unattached to Celtic, Free
1 January 2007 – Craig Brewster from Unattached to Aberdeen, Free
1 January 2007 – Dean Holden from Peterborough United to Falkirk, Undisclosed
1 January 2007 – Danny Murphy from Cork City to Motherwell, Undisclosed
1 January 2007 – Trevor Molloy from St Patrick's Athletic to Motherwell, Undisclosed
1 January 2007 – Paul Keegan from St Patrick's Athletic to Motherwell, Undisclosed
1 January 2007 – Mark McChrystal from Derry City to Partick Thistle, Undisclosed
1 January 2007 – Derek McInnes from Millwall to St Johnstone, Free
3 January 2007 – Dumitru Copil from Atletico Arad to Heart of Midlothian, Free
5 January 2007 – Andrew Webster from Wigan Athletic to Rangers, Loan
5 January 2007 – Jon Daly from Hartlepool United to Dundee United, Undisclosed
6 January 2007 – Eduardas Kurskis from FBK Kaunas to Heart of Midlothian, Undisclosed
6 January 2007 – Arkadiusz Klimek from FBK Kaunas to Heart of Midlothian, Undisclosed
9 January 2007 – Steven Hogg from Shrewsbury Town to Gretna, Loan
11 January 2007 – Sean Dillon from Shelbourne to Dundee United, Undisclosed
11 January 2007 – Momo Sylla from Leicester City to Kilmarnock, Free
11 January 2007 – Kasper Schmeichel from Manchester City to Falkirk, Loan
11 January 2007 – Kevin Smith from Sunderland to Dundee, Free
13 January 2007 – Bobby Ryan from Shelbourne to Dunfermline Athletic, Undisclosed
16 January 2007 – David Weir from Everton to Rangers, Free
18 January 2007 – Adam Hammill from Liverpool to Dunfermline Athletic, Loan
19 January 2007 – Filipe Morais from Millwall to St Johnstone, Loan
25 January 2007 – Ugo Ehiogu from Middlesbrough to Rangers, Free
25 January 2007 – Jean-Joël Perrier-Doumbé from Stade Rennais to Celtic, Loan
27 January 2007 – Jamie Harris from Shelbourne to Dunfermline Athletic, Free
30 January 2007 – Kevin Thomson from Hibernian to Rangers, £2m
31 January 2007 – Krisztian Vadocz from Auxerre to Motherwell, Loan
31 January 2007 – Linas Pilibaitis from FBK Kaunas to Heart of Midlothian, Loan
31 January 2007 – Tomas Kancelskis from FBK Kaunas to Heart of Midlothian, Loan
31 January 2007 – Laryea Kingston from Terek Grozny to Heart of Midlothian, Loan
6 February 2007 – Thomas Sowunmi from Unattached to Hibernian, Free
14 March 2007 – Shana Haji from Real Zaragoza to Hibernian, Free

Out
1 January 2007 – Moses Ashikodi from Rangers to Watford, Nominal fee
11 January 2007 – Stephen Pearson from Celtic to Derby County, £750,000
11 January 2007 – Julien Rodriguez from Rangers to Olympique de Marseille, Free
12 January 2007 – Alan Thompson from Celtic to Leeds United, Loan
17 January 2007 – David Marshall from Celtic to Norwich City, Loan
22 January 2007 – Oumar Konde from Hibernian to Panionios, Undisclosed
23 January 2007 – Dany N'Guessan from Rangers to Lincoln City, Free
25 January 2007 – Jérémy Clément from Rangers to Paris Saint-Germain, £1.8m
30 January 2007 – Lionel Letizi from Rangers to OGC Nice, Free
31 January 2007 – Richie Foran from Motherwell to Southend United, £200,000
31 January 2007 – Simon Lappin from St Mirren to Norwich City, £100,000
31 January 2007 – Kenny Deuchar from Gretna to Northampton Town, Loan
31 January 2007 – Shaun Maloney from Celtic to Aston Villa, £1m

Managerial changes

League competitions

Scottish Premier League

Scottish First Division

Scottish Second Division

Scottish Third Division

Cup honours

Non-league honours

Senior honours

Junior honours

West Region

East Region

North Region

Individual honours

SPFA awards

SWFA awards

Scottish clubs in Europe

Summary

Average coefficient – 6.750

Celtic

Heart of Midlothian

Rangers

Gretna

Hibernian

Scotland national team

Key
 (H) = Home match
 (A) = Away match
 ECQ(B) = European Championship qualifying (Group B)

Deaths
18 July: Jimmy Leadbetter, 78, Ipswich Town winger.
21 July: Bert Slater, 70, Falkirk and Dundee goalkeeper.
5 November: Bobby Shearer, 74, Rangers, Hamilton and Scotland defender; Queen of the South manager.
13 May: Kai Johansen, 66, Morton and Rangers defender.

References

External links
 Scottish Premier League official website
 Scottish Football League official website
 BBC Scottish Premier League portal 
 BBC Scottish Football League portal 

 
Seasons in Scottish football